Melchior Heßler ( – 18 April 1690) was a German engineer and master builder (architect and builder).

Born in Mehlis, Heßler was engineer of the artillery and entered the service of the free imperial city Frankfurt am Main, probably 1661 as Stückleutnant and Stadtbaumeister. The letter of service is dated from 29 May 1675.

His main duty was maintenance of existing buildings. The hall church has some Gothic elements, such as the windows and the piers), and Baroque, such as the portals and the canopy (welsche Haube) of the steeple. It is focused on the sermon (Predigtkirche), with many paintings of biblical scenes, and became a model for other Protestant churches such as the  Dreifaltigkeitskirche in Speyer (1701–1717) and the Dreifaltigkeitskirche in Worms (1709–1725). Heßler died in Frankfurt.

Literature 
 Wolfgang Klötzer (ed.): Frankfurter Biographie. Personengeschichtliches Lexikon. Vol. I, A–L. Waldemar Kramer, Frankfurt am Main 1994, .

17th-century German architects
Architects from Frankfurt
17th-century births
1690 deaths